The 2001 Australian Formula 3 Championship was a CAMS sanctioned motor racing title for drivers of Formula 3 racing cars. It was the first Australian Formula 3 Championship, with that title replacing the previous "Formula 3 National Series". The inaugural championship was won by Peter Hackett driving a Dallara F398 Alfa Romeo.

Team and drivers

Calendar
The championship was contested over a seven round series with two races per round.

Points system
Championship points were awarded on a 20-15-12-10-8-6-4-3-2- basis to the first ten finishers in the Championship class at each race. One bonus point was awarded to the driver setting pole position for each race and a point was also awarded to the driver setting the fastest race lap in each race.

Class points were awarded on a 20-15-12-10-8-6-4-3-2- basis to the first ten class finishers at each race.

Results

References

External links
 Australian Formula 3 - Season 2001, www.speedsport-magazine.com

Australian Formula 3 seasons
Formula 3 Championship
Australia
Australian Formula 3